Alfred Ainger (9 February 18378 February 1904) was an English biographer and critic.

Biography
The son of an architect in London, he was educated at University College School, King's College London and Trinity College, Cambridge, from where he subsequently entered the Church, and, after holding various minor preferments (including teaching at Sheffield Collegiate School from 1864 to 1866), became Master of the Temple in July 1894. He was appointed an Honorary Chaplain to Queen Victoria 28 January 1895, and a Chaplain-in-Ordinary to her Majesty 2 March 1896.

He wrote memoirs of Thomas Hood and George Crabbe, but is best known for his biography of Charles Lamb and his edition of  Lamb's works in 6 volumes (1883–88). He was a contributor the Dictionary of National Biography, writing the entries on Lamb, Alfred Tennyson, Frederick Tennyson, Charles Tennyson Turner and George du Maurier, under the initials "A.A.".

In 1906 Edith Sichel published a 354-page biography of Ainger.

Works
 Crabbe (1903), in the English Men of Letters series
 Charles Lamb (1908)
 The Letters of Charles Lamb (Volume I – Volume II)
 Lectures and essays (Volume 1)
 Lectures and essays (Volume 2)

References

External links

 
 

1837 births
1904 deaths
People educated at University College School
19th-century English Anglican priests
English biographers
Alumni of King's College London
Alumni of Trinity College, Cambridge
Contributors to the Dictionary of National Biography
Masters of the Temple